Archer Memorial Field  is a privately owned public-use airport located seven nautical miles (8 mi, 13 km) southeast of the central business district of St. Johns, in Clinton County, Michigan, United States.

Facilities and aircraft 
Archer Memorial Field covers an area of 12 acres (5 ha) at an elevation of 794 feet (242 m) above mean sea level. It has one runway designated 17/35 with a turf surface measuring 2,496 by 110 feet (761 x 34 m). For the 12-month period ending December 31, 2011, the airport had 150 general aviation aircraft operations, an average of 12 per month. For the same time period, there are three aircraft based on the field, all single-engine airplanes.

References

External links 
 Archer Memorial Field from Michigan Airport Directory
 Aerial photo from USGS The National Map

Airports in Michigan
Transportation in Clinton County, Michigan